Sir Edward Clarence Kerrison, 2nd Baronet (2 January 1821, Brighton – 11 July 1886) was a British Conservative Party politician and the Member of Parliament for the borough of Eye.

Biography
Kerrison was the eldest son of General Sir Edward Kerrison, 1st Baronet and his wife Mary Martha Ellice. He was born at Wick House, Brighton in 1821.

He married Lady Caroline Margaret Fox-Strangways, daughter of Henry Fox-Strangways, 3rd Earl of Ilchester, on 23 July 1844, but had no children.

He succeeded his father in 1852 as Member of Parliament for the borough of Eye and as baronet the following year. He represented Eye until 1866 when he resigned to successfully stand as the Conservative candidate in a by election in East Suffolk, although he resigned the next year.

He joined the board of the Great Eastern Railway as a Deputy Chairman in 1866.

Described as a "Great friend of the agricultural laborers", he also took part in the building of a branch railway to Eye. He died at Brome Hall, Suffolk in 1886, and the baronetcy became extinct.

References

External links 
 

1821 births
1886 deaths
Conservative Party (UK) MPs for English constituencies
Baronets in the Baronetage of the United Kingdom
UK MPs 1852–1857
UK MPs 1857–1859
UK MPs 1859–1865
UK MPs 1865–1868
People from Brighton
People from Brome, Suffolk
Directors of the Great Eastern Railway